Selasia apicalis, is a species of false firefly beetle found in Sri Lanka.

Description
This small species of beetle has a length of about 5.15 mm. Elytra bicolored with darker apices and mostly yellowish brown. Eyes large. Pronotum widest slightly before middle. Pronotum not emarginate medially at posterior margin and with straight posterior margin.  Male genitalia relatively elongate and relatively narrower phallobase. Femora and tibiae are brownish. Metathorax and abdomen also dark brown in color.

References 

Elateridae
Insects of Sri Lanka
Insects described in 1914